Shishkina is a rural locality (a village) in Kenozerskoye Rural Settlement of Plesetsky District, Arkhangelsk Oblast, Russia. The population was 46 as of 2010.

Geography 
Shishkina is located 167 km southwest of Plesetsk (the district's administrative centre) by road. Gory is the nearest rural locality.

References 

Rural localities in Plesetsky District